Frances Mays (born December 1, 1990) is an American football defensive lineman who most recently played for the Bloomington Edge of the Indoor Football League (IFL). He played college football at Florida A&M University and attended Bemidji High School in Bemidji, Minnesota. He has also been a member of the Philadelphia Eagles and Tampa Bay Storm.

Early life
Mays attended Bemidji High School, where he didn't play any sports until he was a senior when he decided to try out for the football team.

College career
Mays played for the Central Lakes College Raiders from 2010 to 2011 where he was named honorable mention Division III All-American and the Florida A&M from 2012 to 2013.

Professional career

Philadelphia Eagles
In 2014, Mays signed as an undrafted free agent with the Philadelphia Eagles. On August 23, 2014, Mays was waived by the Eagles.

Tampa Bay Storm
Mays was assigned to the Tampa Bay Storm of the Arena Football League in April, 2015.

Return to Philadelphia
Mays re-signed with the Eagles on May 7, 2015. On August 10, 2015, Mays was waived.

Portland Steel
Mays was assigned to the Portland Steel on April 5, 2016. He played in just one game for the Steel, and didn't record any statistics. On April 21, 2016, Mays was placed on recallable reassignment.

Iowa Barnstormers
On January 20, 2017, Mays signed with the Iowa Barnstormers.

Bloomington Edge
On October 11, 2017, Mays was traded to the Bloomington Edge.

References

Living people
1990 births
Players of American football from Minnesota
American football defensive linemen
Central Lakes Raiders football players
Florida A&M Rattlers football players
Philadelphia Eagles players
Tampa Bay Storm players
Portland Steel players
Iowa Barnstormers players
Bloomington Edge players